Foulon is a French surname. Notable people with the surname include:

Celia Foulon (born 1979), French rower
Daam Foulon (born 1999), Belgian footballer
Emmanuel Foulon (1871–1945), Belgian archer
Gwenn Foulon (born 1998), French footballer
Joseph-Alfred Foulon (1823–1893), French cardinal
Jérôme Foulon (born 1971), French footballer
Maurice Foulon (1886–1968), French politician
Olivier Foulon (born 1976), Belgian artist
Roger Foulon (1923–2008), Belgian writer
Séverine Foulon (born 1973), French middle-distance runner

See also
Foullon

French-language surnames